The Shadow Secretary of State for Levelling Up, Housing and Communities is a position with the UK Opposition's Shadow Cabinet; if the opposition party forms a new government, the designated person is a likely choice to become the new Levelling Up Secretary.

The position has existed in many iterations, first as Environment, Transport and the Regions in 1997 after the Government's reorganisation. The portfolio shifted among government departments for many years until resting on Housing, Communities and Local Government in 2006, until 2021 when it got its current name

Under Michael Howard, the arrangement was slightly different. There was a Shadow Secretary of State for Local and Devolved Government Affairs in Shadow Cabinet who supervised a Shadow Local Government Secretary and a Shadow Regions Secretary outside of it.

The current Shadow Communities Secretary is Lisa Nandy. The main role is to scrutinise the levelling up policy of the Boris Johnson government.

Shadow Secretary of State for Environment, Transport and the Regions (1997–2001)

Shadow Secretary of State for Transport, Local Government and the Regions (2001–2002)

Shadow Secretary of State for Local Government and the Regions (2002)

Shadow Secretary of State for the Office of the Deputy Prime Minister (2002–2003)

Shadow Secretary of State for Local and Devolved Government Affairs (2003–2005)

Shadow Secretary of State for Local Government Affairs and Communities (2005)

Shadow Secretary of State for the Office of the Deputy Prime Minister (2005–2006)

Shadow Secretary of State for Communities and Local Government (2006–2021)

Shadow Secretary of State for Levelling Up, Housing and Communities (2021–present)

References

Official Opposition (United Kingdom)